Dubki is a rural locality (a village) in Bulgakovsky Selsoviet, Ufimsky District, Bashkortostan, Russia. The population was 219 as of 2010. There are 9 streets.

Geography 
Dubki is located 32 km south of Ufa (the district's administrative centre) by road. Bulgakovo is the nearest rural locality.

References 

Rural localities in Ufimsky District